Buhla is the name for a skeleton of a prehistoric (Paleo-Indian) woman found in a quarry near Buhl, Idaho, United States, in January 1989. The skeleton's age has been estimated by radiocarbon dating at 10,675 ± 95 BP, which confirms this as one of the oldest sets of human remains found in the Americas. The discovery was made by a quarry worker when he noticed what was found to be a thigh bone in the screen of a rock crusher. The nearly complete skeleton was subsequently unearthed nearby.

Scientific analysis
The cause of death could not be determined.

Carbon and nitrogen isotope analysis of Buhla's bone collagen suggests that Buhla ate largely bison and elk, with occasional salmon and other fish. The wear patterns in her teeth indicated that the meat was cooked before eating. Her teeth showed signs of heavy wear caused by sand or grit, wear that would be consistent with the use of stone grinding or pounding. Defects in tooth enamel and lines of interrupted growth on her femur indicate periodic malnutrition. This nutritional stress could be seasonal and/or the result of childhood diseases.

No genetic testing was done, and there is disagreement concerning the morphology of the skull.  Anthropologist Todd Fenton of Michigan State University has indicated that the skull's morphology is similar to that of American Indian, while according to anthropologist Richard Jantz of the University of Tennessee, "She doesn't fit into any modern group but is most similar to today's Polynesians."

Possibility of grave goods
Buhla's right cheek lay atop a pressure-flaked, pointed obsidian tool. Since this tool shows no sign of wear, and since the positioning of this tool seems deliberate, it has been theorized that it was made as a grave offering. In addition, fragments from what could be an awl or pin and a broken bone needle were found with the skeleton, along with an incised badger bone. Like the obsidian tool, the eye of the bone needle showed no signs of wear.

Reburial
Buhla was found on State land, not federal, so the Native American Graves Protection and Repatriation Act (NAGPRA) did not apply.  She was repatriated under State of Idaho Statute, the general provisions of which are that remains determined to be Native American are to be returned to the nearest federally recognized Tribe, in this instance, the Shoshone–Bannock Tribes at Fort Hall. In 1992, the remains and the artifacts were turned over to the Shoshone–Bannock of Fort Hall over the strenuous objections of many archaeologists, and despite the lack of evidence linking Buhla with this tribe.  The tribe reburied the remains in 1993.

See also
Archaeology of the Americas
Arlington Springs Man – (Human remains)
Calico Early Man Site – (Archeological site)
Cueva de las Manos  – (Cave paintings)
Forensic anthropology
Fort Rock Cave – (Archeological site)
List of unsolved deaths
Kennewick Man – (Human remains)
Kwäday Dän Ts'ìnchi – (Human remains)
Luzia Woman – (Human remains)
Marmes Rockshelter – (Archeological site)
Paisley Caves  – (Archeological site)
Peñon woman – (Human remains)

References

Books
 Green, Thomas J., Cochran, Bruce, Fenton, Todd W., Woods, James C., Titmus, Gene L., Tieszen, Larry, Davies, Mary Anne, Miller, Susanne J., "The Buhl Burial: A Paleo Indian Woman From Southern Idaho", American Antiquity, Vol. 63 No. 3, 1998, pp. 437–456.
 Silva, Samantha, Tarmina, Paul, "A Famous Skeleton Returns To The Earth", High Country News, (March 8, Vol. 25 No. 4), 1993.
 Slayman, Andrew, "Buhl Woman", Archaeology (magazine), Volume 51 Number 6, November/December 1998

External links
 Images of tools found with Buhl woman

1989 archaeological discoveries
Archaeological sites in Idaho
Art and cultural repatriation
Buildings and structures in Twin Falls County, Idaho
Human remains (archaeological)
Native American history of Idaho
Oldest human remains in the Americas
Paleo-Indian archaeological sites in the United States
Paleo-Indian period